Winkler Lake is a lake in Carver County, Minnesota, in the United States.

Winkler Lake was named for Ignatz Wiknler, an early settler.

References

Lakes of Minnesota
Lakes of Carver County, Minnesota